Life imprisonment in Switzerland is the most severe penalty under Swiss penal law. It may be imposed for murder, genocide, qualified hostage-taking and the act of arranging a war against Switzerland with foreign powers. Under the military penal code, it can also be imposed in times of war for mutiny, disobedience, cowardice, treason and espionage.

Prisoners sentenced to life imprisonment are eligible for parole after having served fifteen years, or ten years in exceptional cases.

In addition to any penalty imposed, criminals may be sentenced to detention if they have committed or attempted an intentional felony, punishable by imprisonment of five years or more, aimed against the life or well-being of other people (such as murder, rape or arson), and if there is a serious concern that they may repeat such offences. The detention is of indefinite duration, but its continued necessity must be examined by the competent authority once per year.

Following a series of murders by recidivists in the 1980s and 1990s, a citizens' committee collected 194,390 signatures to propose a popular initiative that would amend the constitution to mandate the effective incarceration for life of violent criminals and sex offenders considered untreatable. The amendment was adopted by 56% of the popular vote on February 8, 2004, even though it was supported only by the right-wing Swiss People's Party.

It was unsuccessfully opposed by the other major political parties and the government, as well as by legal scholars who argued that mandatory lifetime detention violates the European Convention on Human Rights. The enabling legislation entered into force on 1 August 2008.

References

Switzerland
Crime in Switzerland